The Lục Nam River, also called Minh Đức River or Chũ River, is a river of Vietnam. It flows for 200 kilometres through Bắc Giang Province and Lạng Sơn Province.

References

Rivers of Bắc Giang province
Rivers of Lạng Sơn province
Rivers of Vietnam